Chano Domínguez (born Sebastián Domínguez Lozano; 29 March  1960, Cádiz) is a Spanish Latin jazz, post bop and flamenco pianist. Dominguez has released over 20 albums as a bandleader, and collaborated extensively with other jazz artists including Paquito D’Rivera, Gonzalo Rubalcaba, Joe Lovano, Chucho Valdés, Martiro, and Wynton Marsalis and the Lincoln Center Jazz Orchestra, He performs his own original compositions, as well as the music of Harold Arlen, Thelonious Monk, Miles Davis, and the Spanish classical composer Joaquín Rodrigo. He was nominated for a Grammy Award in 2012 for his album Flamenco Sketches on the Blue Note label.

Domínguez began his career in the progressive rock group CAI before moving on to jazz. They recorded three LPs from 1978 to 1980, Mas Alla de Nuestras Mentes Diminutas, Noche Abierta and Cancion de Primavera for the Columbia label. After CAI broke up in the early 1980s, Dominguez joined the local, Cadiz-based jazz ensemble, Hixcadix.

Domínguez's initial interest in jazz came from jazz fusion groups like Mahavishnu Orchestra or Weather Report, but later he became interested in Bill Evans and Thelonious Monk. In 1992, he formed his first jazz trio, and won First Prize in the National Jazz Competition for Young Performers that same year, and released his first recording as a leader, Chano, in 1993, followed by Diez de Paco in 1994. From there, Dominguez recorded a number of  projects, including Coplas de Madruga, with the Spanish flamenco singer Martirio.

Domínguez's greatest international exposure came in the year 2000, courtesy of his performance of his composition, “Oye Como Viene,” in Spanish director Fernando Trueba’s Grammy Award-winning Latin jazz documentary Calle 54, which also featured Eliane Elias, Jerry Gonzalez and the Fort Apache Band and Tito Puente. Dominguez has also been nominated for three Latin Grammys, including two in the "Best Flamenco Album" category: a 2002 collaboration with singer Martirio called Mucho Corazon, and a 2015 collaboration with singer Blas Cordoba, AKA “El Keijo”, called Bendito.

Domínguez performs as both a solo artist and in collaboration with a number of different artists and combos. Domínguez performs regularly in a trio with bassist Horacio Fumero and drummer David Xirgu, another trio with bassist Alexis Cuadrado and drummer Henry Cole; as well as various duets with longtime collaborator bassist Javier Colina, a flutist Hadar Noiberg, and pianist Steffano Bolani.

Domínguez’s Flamenco Quartet performs the classic compositions of Manuel de Falla, Isaac Albeniz, Enrique Granados, and Federico Mompou, with percussionist Pablo Dominguez and singer Blas Cordoba and dancer Daniel Navarro. In 2018, Dominguez debuted his quintet consisting of himself, Cuadrado, Cole, Cordoba and Navarro.

In addition to his recording and performing career, Domínguez has taught at Juilliard, the Taller de Músics in Barcelona, the Bogotá Conservatory, and the University of Washington School of Music, among other institutions. Domínguez currently resides in Brooklyn, NY and records for the Queens, NY-based Sunnyside label.

Discography
Chano Nuba Records 1993  
10 de Paco versions of Paco de Lucía's songs, with Jorge Pardo and Tino di Geraldo, 1994.
Hecho a mano (with Tomatito), 1995 
Coplas de Madrugá (With Martirio) 1996 
En directo Café Central 1998
Tú no sospechas,  (With Marta Valdés) 2000
Imán (with Enrique Morente, Sunnyside Records), 1999 
Mira como viene, 2003
Oye como viene, 2003
1993-2003, 2004
Con alma (with George Mraz and Jeff Ballard), 2005
Cuentos del mundo, 2005
Flamenco Jazz, 2005
Acoplados (with Martirio, Sunnyside Records), 2004 
New Flamenco Sound, 2006.
Acércate más, 2004 
Cuentos del Mundo (Sunnyside Records) 2008
Quartier Latin (with Paquito D'Rivera), 2009
Piano Ibérico   (Blue Note)2010
Flamenco sketches (Blue Note) 2011
Chano &Josele (Calle54 Records) 2012
Hecho a Mano (with Enrique Morente, Sunnyside Records) 2015
Over The Rainbow (Sunnyside Records) 2017
Chano & Colina (with Javier Colina, Sunnyside Records) 2018
Quatro (with Magos Herrera) John Finbury (composer) 2020

Awards
In 2020 he was awarded the Premio Nacional de las Músicas Actuales (Spanish National Award on Recent Music styles).

Web sources

External links
Profile Apoloybaco.com; accessed 16 November 2014.  
 Tim Wilkins, "Chano Domínguez Performs with Jazz at Lincoln Center", jazz.com; accessed 16 November 2014. 
 Official Chano Domínguez website; accessed 9 November 2016.
 Nate Chinen, "Remixing Some Catnip to Attract a New Audience", New York Times; accessed 13 May 2018. 
 Ed Hazell, "Chano Dominguez: Over The Rainbow", jazziz.com; accessed 13 May 2018. 
 ALIA Prod website; accessed 13 May 2018.

1960 births
Living people
Spanish jazz pianists
Latin jazz pianists
Post-bop pianists
Progressive rock pianists
People from Cádiz
Musicians from Andalusia
21st-century pianists
Sunnyside Records artists
Blue Note Records artists